Anna Cheong Ching Yik (born 15 March 1998) is a Malaysian badminton player. She won her first international title at the 2021 Czech Open in the women's doubles together with Teoh Mei Xing, and they won their first World Tour title at the 2022 Syed Modi International.

Achievements

BWF World Tour (1 title) 
The BWF World Tour, which was announced on 19 March 2017 and implemented in 2018, is a series of elite badminton tournaments sanctioned by the Badminton World Federation (BWF). The BWF World Tours are divided into levels of World Tour Finals, Super 1000, Super 750, Super 500, Super 300 (part of the HSBC World Tour), and the BWF Tour Super 100.

Women's doubles

BWF International Challenge/Series (1 title, 3 runners-up) 
Women's doubles

  BWF International Challenge tournament
  BWF International Series tournament
  BWF Future Series tournament

References

External links 
 

1998 births
Living people
People from Malacca
Malaysian sportspeople of Chinese descent
Malaysian female badminton players
21st-century Malaysian women